The 1930 Kentucky Wesleyan Panthers football team represented Kentucky Wesleyan College as a member the Southern Intercollegiate Athletic Association (SIAA) during the 1930 college football season. Led by third-year head coach Rip Van Winkle, the Panthers compiled an overall record of 2–4–3, with a mark of 2–1–1 in conference play. At the conclusion of the season, the football program at Wesleyan was discontinued. The college subsequently reinstated football for the 1983 season.

Schedule

References

Kentucky Wesleyan
Kentucky Wesleyan Panthers football seasons
Kentucky Wesleyan Panthers